Zsigmond Czakó (Dés, 20 June 1820 – Pest, 14 December 1847) was a Hungarian actor and playwright.

He studied philosophy and the law in Kolozsvár and Nagyenyed, and worked at the National Theatre of Hungary.

However, his dramas written after his first success (Leona and The Frivolous, first performed at the National Theatre on 25 February 1847) were much weaker than the first, the audience became colder and the criticism more severe, which made the young poet, who was already in a sick mood, despair. He was determined to create a work that would surpass all his previous plays. The result of his determination was his last play on historical subjects, The Knight John. (It was performed at the National Theatre on 13 March 1848.) He read his finished manuscript to some friends, who, perhaps a little too severely, but with sincerity of conviction, detected in it essential defects and considered it by no means as excellent as the author himself. This had such a crushing effect on him that soon after the severe criticism expressed by his friends, and without waiting for the performance of his work, he shot himself in the head with a pistol in the editorial office of the Pesti Hírlap. Petőfi and Arany also wrote poems in his memory.  

He committed suicide at age 27.

Main works
Kalmár és tengerész (1844)
Szent László és kora (1844)
Végrendelet (1845)
Leona (1846)
János lovag (1847)
Könnyelműek (1847)
Összes munkái (Redaktis József Ferenczy, I-II, Bp., 1883–84).

References

Bibliography 
Magyar Életrajzi Lexikon

1820 births
1847 deaths
Hungarian writers
Hungarian male stage actors
19th-century Hungarian male actors
People from Dej
1840s suicides